Dominique Barbéris (born 1958) is a French novelist, author of literary studies and university professor, specializing in stylistics and writing workshops.

Biography
Born in 1958 in Cameroon into a French family of Nantes, her father was a diplomat in Africa. Dominique Barberis studied at the Ecole Normale Superieure de Sèvres and the University of Sorbonne, after her childhood in Nantes, then in Brussels.  She began teaching at a high school in Boulogne-Billancourt before joining an insurance company as head of communications. She later taught in several other schools. Then she was appointed professor at the University of Paris IV in foreign languages and applied foreign languages at the French language department in which she runs courses and workshops on writing fiction.
She published her first novel La Ville with Éditions Arléa in 1996 at the age of 38, before joining Gallimard in 1998 as an author.  In 2019, she returned to Arléa, where she published Un dimanche à Ville-d'Avray.
She has also published several literary studies and prefaces.

Bibliography

Literature 
 La Ville 1996
 L'Heure exquise 1998 - Marianne Award
 Le Temps des dieux 2000
 Les Kangourous 2002, filmed in 2005 by Anne Fontaine under the title Entre ses mains -
 Ce qui s'enfuit 2005
 Quelque chose à cacher 2007 - Prix des Deux Magots 2008 and City of Nantes Award, 2008.
 Beau Rivage 2010
 La vie en marge, 2014
 L'Année de l'éducation sentimentale, 2016
 Un dimanche à Ville-d'Avray, 2019

Studies and prefaces
 Un amour de Swann, 1990
 Chateaubriand 1994
 Un roi sans divertissement : an introduction to the work of Jean Giono 1991
 Langue et littérature : Anthology of XIX and XX century, (with Dominique Rincé) 1992
 Moderato cantabile / L'Amant, Marguerite Duras, 1995
 Le Grand Meaulnes, Alain Fournier,1996
 Je suis aussi... preface to the poetry of Carlos Alvarado-Larroucau, Coll. Poètes des cinq continents, L'Harmattan, 2009

Reviews on her work
 Quatre lectures, Four readings: critical essay of Jean-Pierre Richard, Fayard 2002.

References

Sources
Part of this biography was obtained from her studies and prefaces.
See also:
 Interview with Anne Fontaine in Europe 2.
 Les Sanglots de l'automne, Le Figaro Littéraire, jeudi 4 octobre 2007
 L'air du soupcon, Liberation, 20 September 2007
 Secret automne, Le Figaro magazine, 28 September 2007
 El Louvre, inspiración para la ficción, La Nación, 21 January 2009
Other Interviews, in The Nouvel Obs, The Sud Ouest, and many other newspapers.

1958 births
Living people
University of Paris alumni
French women writers
French essayists
Prix des Deux Magots winners
Place of birth missing (living people)
French women essayists
French expatriates in Cameroon